In the Flesh is the debut LP released by the band Nader Sadek, released on May 16, 2011 in Europe and a day later in the United States. The whole album is about the hazards of a petroleum-based society. Two music videos have been released for the tracks "Sulffer" and "Nigredo In Necromance".

Track listing

Personnel

Nader Sadek 
Steve Tucker – vocals
Rune Eriksen – guitar
Nicholas McMaster – bass
Flo Mounier – drums

Additional personnel 
Nader Sadek – all songwriting, artwork, direction, concepts
Travis Ryan – additional vocals

References

2011 debut albums
Nader Sadek albums
Season of Mist albums